Frédéric Rodriguez-Luz (born 1964), also known as Frédéric Luz, is a French writer and heraldist. He is also the current pretender to the "throne" of  the Kingdom of Araucanía and Patagonia, "an ephemeral 19th-century state." This has also been described as a "non-existent kingdom not recognized by any State" currently represented by a French non-profit organization dedicated to international campaigning on behalf of the Mapuche people.

Life and Work
Frédéric Nicolas Jacques Rodriguez-Luz was born on 9 March 1964 in Toulouse, France. His Spanish grandfather settled in France after seeking exile from Francoist Spain.

Since 1984, Frédéric Luz has worked professionally as a heraldist and has published a number of works on heraldry. He was a heraldic advisor to Henri d'Orléans, Count of Paris.  In 2003 and 2004, Luz created coats of arms for cities and government ministries in the Republic of Senegal, as well as for Senegalese Presidents Léopold Sédar Senghor and Abdoulaye Wade. For his work, he was made a Commander of the National Order of the Lion of Senegal. Luz lives in France, is married (to Annie-Marie) and has two children.

Pretender to the throne of Araucanía and Patagonia 

On August 28, 1873, the Criminal Court of Paris ruled that Antoine de Tounens, first "king of Araucania and Patagonia" did not justify his status of sovereign.

Since the death of Antoine de Tounens, some French citizens without familial relations declared themselves to be pretenders to the throne of Araucania and Patagonia. Whether the Mapuche themselves accept this, or are even aware of it, is unclear.

The pretenders to the "throne of Araucania and Patagonia" are called monarchs and sovereigns of fantasy, "having only fanciful claims to a kingdom without legal existence and having no international recognition".

The Kingdom of Araucanía and Patagonia is represented by a French non-profit organization whose purpose is to fight for the recognition of Mapuche culture, language and religion.

Frédéric Luz became actively involved in the work of the "Kingdom" of Araucania and Patagonia in 2014. Jean-Michel Parasiliti di Para as known as "Prince Antoine IV of Araucania and Patagonia" named him minister of communications and judge of arms of the Kingdom of Araucania and Patagonia. He was also made vice President of UN-recognized NGO, Auspice Stella, which works to promote Mapuche rights in the international community.

On March 24, 2018, Frédéric Luz was elected pretender to the throne of Araucania and Patagonia.

Works
Armorial de France et d'Europe, No. 1, (Courtnay, 1990)
Armorial de France et d'Europe, No. 2, (Gaillac: La Place royale éditions, 1991)
Le soufre & l'encens: Enquête sur les Eglises parallèles et les évêques dissidents, (Paris: C. Vigne, 1995)
Le blason & ses secrets: Retrouver ou créer ses armoiries aujourd'hui, (Paris: C. Vigne, 1995)
Blasons des familles d'Europe: Grand armorial universel, (Gaillac: La Place royal éditions, 1996)
Dictionnaire du blason / L.-A. Duhoux d'Argicourt, preface by Frederic Luz, (Gaillac: La Place royale éditions, 1996)
Armorial de France et d'Europe, No. 6, (Gaillac: La Place royal éditions, 1998)
Orthodoxie, (Puiseaux : Pardès, 2001)
Armorial de France et d'Europe, (Gaillac: La Place royale éditions, 2002)
Armorial de France et d'Europe, (Gaillac: La Place royale éditions, 2005)

Honours 
  Commander of the National Order of the Lion

References

External links 

Araucania
Kings of Araucania
1964 births
French male writers
Living people
Recipients of orders, decorations, and medals of Senegal